Platnick is a surname. Notable people with the surname include:

 Brian Platnick, American bridge player
 Norman I. Platnick (1951–2020), American biological systematist and arachnologist
 Ray Platnick (1917–1986), American photojournalist and newspaper photographer

See also
 Platnick (spider)
 Plotnick